Kianga is a small town on the South Coast of New South Wales, Australia, immediately north of the town of Narooma. The town contains few facilities and thus relies on nearby Dalmeny and Narooma. At the 2011 census, Kianga had a population of 738.

Access
Kianga is situated between Dalmeny to the north and North Narooma to the south. Kianga is accessible from the north and south along Dalmeny Drive. This makes up a large portion of Tourist Drive 5 along the coastline. There are bus routes that run through Kianga connecting the town with the rest of the south coast. The Narooma to Dalmeny Cycleway also passes along the coast through Kianga allowing for access on foot or by bicycle

Beaches
There are three beaches in Kianga, Kianga Beach, Kianga Reef Beach and Carters Beach. Kianga Lake is part of the Batemans Marine Park and is classified as a Sanctuary Zone, prohibiting all types of recreational fishing. The mouth of the lake marks the latitude (36°11.536′S) where the ocean zoning changes from General Use Zone, north of the latitudinal line to Habitat Protection Zone, south of the line.

Shopping
There is one store in Kianga, which acts as a restaurant and small general store. It is popular during the tourist peak season due to its location and coastal views.

Other
The sewage treatment plant, west of Kianga, services the local area including Dalmeny and Narooma.

References

Towns in New South Wales
Towns in the South Coast (New South Wales)
Coastal towns in New South Wales